Sky Bahamas was an airline based in Nassau, Bahamas.

History
SkyBahamas Airlines in 2006. SkyBahamas has been forced to suspend flight operations pending the renewal of its Air Operator's Certificate (AOC) by the Bahamas Civil Aviation Authority (BCAA) on July 8, 2019.

Destinations
The airline had scheduled service within the Bahamas (Marsh Harbour, Abaco; New Bight, Cat Island; and George Town, Exuma) as well as charters to the Caribbean.

Fleet
The Sky Bahamas fleet consisted of the following aircraft (as of 2019):

References

External links 

 "Sky Bahamas Crash Lands in Abaco" Nb12 News YouTube. Retrieved June 13, 2013
 "Accident description" aviation-safety.net Retrieved June 13, 2013

 

Defunct airlines of the Bahamas
Airlines established in 1988
Airlines disestablished in 2019